Blood is an EP by the Polish death metal band Vader. It was released on 22 September 2003 in Europe via Metal Blade, and day after in Poland by Metal Mind. Japanese edition was released on 22 October 2003 by Avalon Marquee.

Tracks 1-2 were recorded and mixed in July 2003 at RG Studio in Gdańsk, Poland. Mastering took place at RG Studio in Gdańsk, Poland. Tracks 3-7 were recorded and mixed between February and March 2002 at Red Studio in Gdańsk, Poland during Revelations (2002) sessions, and mastered at Studio 333 in Częstochowa, Poland. 
 
This is the last release with drummer Krzysztof Raczkowski, the first one with Marcin Nowak as bass player (without performing on the tracks), and featuring Jacek Hiro's performance, it is the only release with the participation of all members from Dies Irae.

Track listing

Personnel
Production and performance credits are adapted from the album liner notes.

Charts

Weekly

Monthly

Release history

References 

2003 EPs
Vader (band) albums
Metal Mind Productions albums
Metal Blade Records EPs